Earl Schenck Miers (27 May 1910 – 17 November 1972) was an American historian. He wrote over 100 books, mostly about the history of the American Civil War. Some of them were intended for children, including three historic novels in the We Were There series.

Biography
Miers was born in Brooklyn. He moved to Hackensack, New Jersey as a child and started writing with a typewriter while he was in school as his cerebral palsy prevented his ability to write with a pencil.

Miers received honorary degrees from Lincoln College and Rutgers University.

On 17 November 1972, at the age of 62, Miers died at his home in Edison, New Jersey.

Bibliography
Crossroads of Freedom: The American Revolution and the Rise of a New Nation. by Earl Schenck Miers. New Brunswick, N.J., Rutgers University Press [1971]

References

People from Edison, New Jersey
Writers from Hackensack, New Jersey
Lincoln College (Illinois) alumni
Rutgers University alumni
Historians of the American Civil War
1910 births
1972 deaths
20th-century American historians
American male non-fiction writers
Historians from New Jersey
20th-century American male writers